Trenton William Harmon (born October 8, 1990) is an American country music singer who gained national attention for winning the fifteenth season of American Idol on April 7, 2016.

Early life and education
Harmon was born in Amory, Mississippi, the son of Cindy and Randy Harmon and second cousin of actor Richard Harmon. He started in music when his mother taught him to sing "Amazing Grace" when he was the age of five, and he grew up singing in church. His family owns a farm and a yard-to-table restaurant, Longhorn, where he was a waiter. He credits his upbringing on the farm and in the restaurant for his strong work ethic.

He sang and performed through many musicals while attending Amory High School and, later, the University of Arkansas at Monticello where he also led on-campus worship services as an undergraduate. He first learned to play the piano but expanded to also play drums and guitar.

Music career
Harmon first tried for national recognition in May 2014 when a close friend convinced him to try out for NBC's The Voice in New Orleans. After singing "Stay with Me" by Sam Smith for the casting director he was one of 300 open audition contestants chosen to compete further from a field of 32,000. The show then flew him to compete in Los Angeles where he sang "Jealous" by Nick Jonas. Months later in October 2014 he was again flown to Los Angeles for several weeks with his family to be filmed for the show although ultimately no judge chose him and his audition did not air. Harmon later stated that the rejection prepared him for his 'Idol' phase of his career.

American Idol
Harmon auditioned for American Idol in Little Rock, Arkansas in August 2015, surprising the judges, after hearing of his farm upbringing, singing the rhythm and blues song "Unaware" by Allen Stone. He was the first RnB singer shown to be accepted by the judges in the season. It was revealed later in the season that Harmon kept a leather-bound journal where he wrote down every comment and criticism the judges offered.

During Hollywood week he was encouraged to quit when diagnosed with mono, and sequestered in a bathroom for most of the week to keep the contagious disease from spreading. Harmon impressed the judges when, for an 'Idol' first he performed the group round as a solo.

During "Idol Grammy Hits" week Harmon was coached to bring his "strange faces he makes when he sings" under control. Judge Harry Connick Jr. noted Harmon also lost an "exaggerated jaw vibrato" that would eventually cause him to lose his singing voice.

Harmon won the fifteenth season of American Idol on April 7, 2016. His winning coronation single "Falling" was written by singer songwriter and American Idol judge Keith Urban with Dallas Davidson and Brett James. For winning the title, Harmon received a Ford car and a recording contract with Big Machine Records.  La'Porsha Renae was named runner-up. Harmon parted ways with Big Machine in May 2019.

Performances

Post-Idol
Following his win on American Idol Harmon was signed by Big Machine Records. His album has country and indie-soul influences. Big Machine's Scott Borcheta said it would be like the country album Justin Timberlake would make.

In a post-show interview Harmon was asked his thoughts on home state's anti-LGBT "Religious Liberty" legislation (HB1523) which allows people and businesses to deny service to LGBT people. Harmon recounted that in the restaurant business, he served whoever walked in the door and treated them with respect, and "I think that you should treat all people equally and respectfully, and that's what I do, and that's what I'm going to continue to do no matter what law is passed."

In December 2016, he released his self-titled EP which features his Top 30 hit "There's a Girl" and four other tracks.

Throughout 2017, Harmon experienced some difficulties, from a personal break-up, to his record label folding and its parent company restructuring, leaving his contract in limbo. By the end of the year, his label issues were resolved and he re-signed with Big Machine Label Group.

In February 2018, he premiered the single "You Got 'Em All", which also serves as the title track for his debut album, released on May 18, 2018.

Discography

Albums

Extended plays

Singles

Music videos

See also
List of Idols winners

References

External links

Trent Harmon on Vevo
Trent Harmon's VEVO on YouTube
Trent Harmon's channel on YouTube

American country singer-songwriters
American male singer-songwriters
American male guitarists
21st-century American singers
American multi-instrumentalists
Singer-songwriters from Mississippi
American Idol winners
1990 births
Living people
People from Amory, Mississippi
University of Arkansas at Monticello alumni
21st-century American guitarists
21st-century American pianists
Guitarists from Mississippi
21st-century American drummers
Amory High School alumni
American male pianists
Country musicians from Mississippi
Country musicians from Arkansas
21st-century American male singers
Singer-songwriters from Arkansas